When Worlds Collide is a 1994 compilation album by Thin White Rope.  Intended as a "best of" compilation and released after the band's demise, it brings together some highlights from all five studio albums, plus some bonus tracks.   The title comes from the lyrics of the song Tina and Glen.

Track listing
Down In The Desert 3:24 (Kyser/Becker)  (From "Exploring The Axis")
Valley Of The Bones 2:54 (Kyser)  (From "Bottom Feeders") 
Moonhead 4:45 (Kyser/Becker/Kunkel/Tesluk)  (From "Moonhead")
Elsie Crashed The Party 3:36 (Kyser)  (From "In The Spanish Cave") 
Red Sun (Original Version) 2:07 (Kyser)  (From "Red Sun") 
Eleven 2:23 (Kyser)  (From "Exploring The Axis") 
Ruby Sea 4:22 (Kyser/Abourezk)  (From "The Ruby Sea") 
Crawl Piss Freeze 5:34 (Kyser/Tesluk)  (From "Moonhead") 
Tina And Glen 2:22 (Kyser)  (From "The Ruby Sea") 
Macy's Window 3:44 (Kyser)  (From "In The Spanish Cave") 
Triangle Song 4:40 (Kyser/Kunkel/Abourezk)  (From "Sack Full Of Silver") 
Diesel Man 3:40 (Kyser)  (From "Sack Full Of Silver") 
Some Velvet Morning 4:40 (Hazlewood)  (From "Red Sun") 
The Napkin Song 1:28 (Kyser)  (From "Sack Full Of Silver") 
Burn The Flames 5:30 (Erickson)  (From "Where The Pyramid Meets The Eye")
Fish Song 3:53 (Kyser)  (From "The Ruby Sea")

1994 albums